Paula Szkody (born July 17, 1948) is a professor in the Department of Astronomy at the University of Washington in Seattle. She served as president of the American Astronomical Society from 2020 to 2022.

Early life and education
Szkody was born on July 17, 1948, in Detroit, Michigan. She earned her  B.A. degree in astrophysics at Michigan State University in 1970, and her Ph.D. in astronomy from the University of Washington in 1975.

Work
Paula Szkody specializes in cataclysmic variable stars, which are binary star systems that periodically undergo energetic outbursts. She is an active participant in the Sloan Digital Sky Survey (SDSS) searching for new dwarf novae and has worked with the XTE, ASCA, ROSAT, IUE, HST, EUVE and XMM-Newton space missions.

Activities
In 2005 she became the editor-in-chief of the astronomical journal Publications of the Astronomical Society of the Pacific (PASP). She is also very active in professional-amateur collaboration, especially in conjunction with the American Association of Variable Star Observers, for whom she has served both as an officer on the board (2003-2009) and, for the term 2007-09, as President of the organization. Szkody was president of the American Astronomical Society from 2020 to 2022.

Honors and awards
In 1978, she was awarded the Annie Jump Cannon Award in Astronomy by the American Astronomical Society.

As of 1994, she is a fellow of the American Association for the Advancement of Science.

A minor planet has been named after her.

References

Further reading

External links
American Association of Variable Star Observers (AAVSO)
AAVSO Presidents poster

American women astronomers
Recipients of the Annie J. Cannon Award in Astronomy
Living people
1948 births
University of Washington faculty